Jerome Patrick Kelly (born November 23, 1966) is an American professional golfer who plays on the PGA Tour and PGA Tour Champions.

Career
Born and raised in Madison, Wisconsin, Kelly graduated from the University of Hartford in 1989 and turned professional later that year, but didn't make it onto the PGA Tour until 1996. This followed a successful 1995 season on the second tier Nike Tour, when he won two tournaments. His best career year to date is 2002, when he finished fourth on the PGA Tour money list and won the PGA Tour's Sony Open in Hawaii and Advil Western Open.

Kelly won the 2009 Zurich Classic of New Orleans with a two-foot par putt on the final hole, beating three players by one stroke (Charlie Wi, Rory Sabbatini, and Charles Howell III). It had been seven years since his previous win.

Kelly's highest Official World Golf Ranking was 18th in 2003.

For the first time in his PGA Tour career, Kelly finished outside the valued top 125 on the tour's money list, ending the 2012 season just $1,809 out of a full Tour card. He also finished 2012 as the 25th highest earning PGA Tour golfer in history. Instead of going to Q school (where his finish would have placed him directly into the final stage), Kelly played the 2013 season using a career money list exemption, nineteen places higher on the PGA Tour priority ranking list than the 126-150 category (Priority Ranking 29). During his PGA Tour career, Kelly made 616 starts and earned almost 29 million dollars.

Kelly made his PGA Tour Champions debut at the Chubb Classic in February 2017, and gained his first win six months later at the Boeing Classic outside Seattle.

In January 2018, Kelly won the Mitsubishi Electric Championship at Hualalai.

In June 2019, Kelly won the American Family Insurance Championship. In September 2019, he won The Ally Challenge for his fifth PGA Tour Champions title. In October 2019, he won the SAS Championship with a final round 65.

In August 2020, Kelly won his first senior major championship, the Bridgestone Senior Players Championship at Firestone Country Club in Ohio. With the win, Kelly earned $450,000 and qualified for the 2021 Players Championship.

In June 2021, Kelly defended his hometown title at the American Family Insurance Championship in Madison, Wisconsin. The 2020 event had been cancelled due to the COVID-19 pandemic. This was Kelly's eighth victory on the PGA Tour Champions.

In July 2022, Kelly won the Senior Players Championship for the second time. Kelly shot a final round of 2-under 68 and won by two strokes over defending champion Steve Stricker. The win was Kelly's second senior major championship

Personal life
Kelly was an all-city ice hockey selection in high school while playing for Madison East and has said his hockey background may have hurt his golf early in his career because of the aggressiveness it encourages him to bring to his game.

Professional wins (18)

PGA Tour wins (3)

PGA Tour playoff record (0–1)

Nike Tour wins (2)

Nike Tour playoff record (1–0)

Other wins (3)
1992 Wisconsin State Open
2006 Merrill Lynch Shootout (with Rod Pampling)
2009 The Shark Shootout (with Steve Stricker)

PGA Tour Champions wins (11)

PGA Tour Champions playoff record (3–1)

Results in major championships

WD = withdrew
CUT = missed the half-way cut
"T" = tied

Summary

Most consecutive cuts made – 6 (2005 PGA – 2007 Open Championship)
Longest streak of top-10s – 2 (2007 Masters – 2007 U.S. Open)

Results in The Players Championship

CUT = missed the halfway cut
"T" indicates a tie for a place
C = Canceled after the first round due to the COVID-19 pandemic

Results in World Golf Championships

QF, R16, R32, R64 = Round in which player lost in match play
"T" = tied
Note that the HSBC Champions did not become a WGC event until 2009.

Senior major championships

Wins (2)

Results timeline

"T" indicates a tie for a place
NT = No tournament due to COVID-19 pandemic

U.S. national team appearances
Professional
Presidents Cup: 2003 (tie)

See also
1995 Nike Tour graduates
List of golfers with most PGA Tour Champions wins

References

External links

American male golfers
Hartford Hawks men's golfers
PGA Tour golfers
Winners of senior major golf championships
Korn Ferry Tour graduates
Golfers from Wisconsin
Sportspeople from Madison, Wisconsin
1966 births
Living people